Nancy Giles (born July 17, 1960) is an American actress and commentator, perhaps best known for her appearances in the series China Beach and on CBS News Sunday Morning.

Early life
Nancy Giles was born in New York City, the daughter of Dorothy Aileen (née Dove) and Thomas Jefferson Giles. She is a graduate of Oberlin College.

Career
Giles was a member of the Second City Touring Company in 1984. She is a writer and contributor to CBS News Sunday Morning. She was the announcer and co-host of Fox After Breakfast.

She starred in two ABC television series, playing girl Private Frankie Bunsen for three seasons on China Beach and hostile waitress Connie Morris on the sitcom Delta. She had guest roles on shows including The Jury, L.A. Law, Spin City, Law & Order, Dream On, and The Fresh Prince of Bel Air. She appeared in the 1985 Broadway production of the musical Mayor.

Giles and her CBS colleague, correspondent Erin Moriarty, have collaborated on two public-affairs radio series under the Giles and Moriarty banner, one for WPHT in Philadelphia and another for Greenstone Media. Both shows were produced at the facilities of the CBS Radio Network.

Giles gave the commencement address for the Ramapo College's graduating class of 2007 and Grinnell College's graduating class of 2014.

In 2017 Giles along with CBS News colleague Nancy Wyatt launch the popular podcast The Giles Files.

Personal life
As of March 2020, Giles lives in Weehawken, New Jersey. During the COVID-19 pandemic in the United States, she self-isolated to avoid infection, and produced in "A brisk walk with Nancy Giles", which documented her walk around the town, in particular up the inclined block on which Weehawken High School is located, and up Boulevard East, across from which the view of the Manhattan skyline prompted her to reflect on her parents' emigration to the area 70 years earlier.

Partial filmography

Film

Television

Videogames

References

External links

1960 births
Actresses from New York City
African-American actresses
American women comedians
American film actresses
American musical theatre actresses
American television actresses
Living people
Oberlin College alumni
CBS News people
Comedians from New York City
American political commentators
21st-century American comedians
21st-century American actresses
20th-century African-American women singers
21st-century African-American women
21st-century African-American people